Adam Wilsby (born 7 August 2000) is a Swedish professional ice hockey defenceman who plays for the Milwaukee Admirals in the American Hockey League (AHL) as a prospect to the Nashville Predators of the National Hockey League (NHL). Wilsby was drafted by the Predators in the fourth round of the 2020 NHL Entry Draft with the 101st overall pick. While playing professionally with Skellefteå AIK of the Swedish Hockey League (SHL), he was signed to a two-year, entry-level contract with the Predators on 14 April 2022.

Career statistics

References

External links

2000 births
Living people
Milwaukee Admirals players
Nashville Predators draft picks
Skellefteå AIK players
Ice hockey people from Stockholm
Södertälje SK players
Swedish ice hockey defencemen